Innamorata is American rock singer Pat Benatar's tenth studio album, and her eleventh album overall, released in 1997. It charted a single week on the US Billboard album chart, at No. 171.

Track listing
All songs by Pat Benatar and Neil Giraldo, except as noted

 "Guitar Intro" – 0:23
 "Only You" – 6:05
 "River of Love" – 5:17
 "I Don't Want to Be Your Friend" – 5:09
 "Strawberry Wine" – 5:53
 "Purgatory" – 4:54
 "Papa's Roses" – 4:20
 "At This Time" – 4:37
 "Dirty Little Secrets" (Benatar, Giraldo, Bob Thiele Jr.) – 5:18
 "Angry" – 4:09
 "In These Times" – 6:49
 "Innamorata" – 3:23
 "Gina's Song" (Haley Giraldo) – 0:22

Singles

Personnel

Band members
Pat Benatar – vocals, percussion, mixing
Neil Giraldo – guitar, keyboards, percussion, producer, mixing
Mick Mahan – bass
Allison Cornell – violin, keyboards
Ray Brinker – drums, percussion

Additional musicians
Doug Norwine – saxophone
Susie Katayama – cello
Scott Breadman – percussion
T Lavitz – Hammond B3

Production
Russ Fowler – engineer, mixing
Charles Boulis, Steve MacMillan, Pat Thrasher, John Aguto, Jeff Thomas – engineers
Joe Gastwirt – mastering

Charts

References

1997 albums
Pat Benatar albums
CMC International albums